David Payne may refer to:
 David Payne (footballer) (born 1947), English footballer
 David Payne (cricketer) (born 1991), Gloucestershire and England cricketer
 David L. Payne (1836–1884), American soldier and pioneer, "Father of Oklahoma"
 David N. Payne (born 1944), professor of photonics at the University of Southampton
 David Payne (politician) (born 1944), Canadian politician
 David Payne (hurdler) (born 1982), American 110 m hurdles runner
 David Payne (artist) (1843–1894), Scottish landscape painter
 David Payne (meteorologist) (born 1968), American television meteorologist
 David Payne (novelist) (born 1955), American novelist
 Davey Payne (born 1944), English saxophonist
 Davy Payne (c. 1949–2003), Northern Irish paramilitary